A Day on Skates: The Story of a Dutch Picnic is a children's novel by Hilda van Stockum. The novel, illustrated by the author, was first published in 1934 and was a Newbery Honor recipient in 1935. The foreword is by Edna St. Vincent Millay.

When winter finally brings snow and ice to their Frisian village, nine-year-old twins Evert and Afke and their classmates are delighted when their teacher announces that the class is going on an all-day ice skating picnic.

A public domain online edition of A Day on Skates: The Story of a Dutch Picnic, a 1935 Newbery Honor Book, is available at A Celebration of Women Writers.

See also 

 Hans Brinker, or The Silver Skates

References

External links
Online edition of Day on Skates

1934 American novels
American children's novels
Newbery Honor-winning works
Novels set in the Netherlands
1934 children's books